Laurent-Désiré Kabila, the former president of the Democratic Republic of the Congo, was assassinated in his office inside his official residence at the , Kinshasa on 16 January 2001. The assassin who killed him was his 18-year-old bodyguard named , who has also been previously identified as Rashidi Kasereka. Mizele was later shot dead. It was believed that some former child soldiers (kadogos) were part of this plan.

Background 
Kabila was responsible for the deaths of many kadogos in the time leading up to his assassination. The day before his assassination, Kabila had overseen the execution of 47 kadogos who were accused of plotting to kill him. Kabila's military standing had deteriorated, and his life was in jeopardy.

In November 2000, Kabila thought that he had discovered a plot against him, and had arrested, tormented, and killed soldiers loyal to Commandant Anselme Masasu Nindaga, who had days earlier made a speech at a reunion for 1,200 kadogos in Kinshasa. The conspiracy to murder Kabila began in early January 2001, when a group of kadogos traveled to Brazzaville and prepared Operation Mbongo Zero.

Operation Mbongo Zero 
The conspirators' scheme, known as Operation Mbongo Zero, outlined how they would infiltrate important buildings in the capital, such as the Marble Palace. Mbongo means "bull" in Swahili. After gaining access to the palace, the penetrators would approach the president with a revolver and fire at him. This group of perpetrators were kadogos who had fought with Kabila against Mobutu Sese Seko's military dictatorship. Kasereka was reported to have said "I will kill him".

Attack 
On 16 January 2001, the assassin entered the president's office as Kabila was discussing with an economics adviser, Emile Mota, about a forthcoming summit meeting with France, which he hoped would protect his presidency of the Congo. The assassin bent over Kabila, and, when the president leaned towards him, assuming the bodyguard wanted to speak to him, pulled out a revolver and shot the president four times in the abdomen. The assassin escaped the palace with other conspirators amidst gunfire.

Former Health Minister Leonard Mashako Mamba was next door to the office when Kabila was shot, and arrived immediately after the assassination. Mwenze Kongolo had been waiting for admission to the palace at 1:45 pm and heard gunshots being fired inside the building. Other bodyguards rushed into the room and fired at the assassin, who was hit first in the leg, then twice more to make sure he was dead. After 15 minutes, Kabila was in a helicopter headed to a clinic in Gombe, Kinshasa. Curfew that day started at 6 pm, and after 8 hours, a motorcade set off from the clinic for the long drive to N'djili Airport, escorting the ambulance.

Kabila was rushed in a helicopter to Harare, Zimbabwe for medical treatment, but was declared dead on 18 January 2001 at 10 am.

Funeral 
Kabila had a state funeral on 20 January 2001, when he was flown to Moba, his home village, then to Lubumbashi, then back to Kinshasa. Kabila was buried in the Mausolée de Laurent Désiré Kabila, in Kinshasa. Armed Zimbabwean soldiers stood around the People's Palace, where the funeral took place, and nearby roads were blocked by armored cars. Hundreds of Angolan troops had also been called.

The presidents of Angola and Zimbabwe were also present at the funeral.

Aftermath 

After his father's death, Joseph Kabila succeeded his father at the young age of 29, which makes him the first head of state to be born in the 1970's. Some individuals were accused of being involved in a plot to overthrow his regime as well. Even with the loss of power, the government had remained stable.

After the assassination, a group of kadogos were eventually arrested and admitted their involvement of the operation. The assassination was an act of revenge after Kabila betrayed them after meeting with one of the kadogos' longtime enemy, Paul Kagame. According to the Justice Minister Mwenze Kongolo, the killer was Rashidi Kasereka, who was shot later while escaping the palace.

It has also been assumed that a bodyguard had shot Kabila. An investigation found 135 people who were accused of the killing of Kabila, including 4 children. Some sources stated 115 were accused. No one was found to be the killer of Kabila. The RFI had stated on the air a radio message in France of Kabila's death. Foreign Minister Louis Michel told RTBF that Kabila's death was not a coup d'etat but was rather "an argument that descended into violence". Michel had also stated that "[Kabila was] dead, killed by his own bodyguard, who had "apparently fired two bullets."

The assassin, Kasereka was in the Brazzaville-Kinshasa area before his death. 26 people, including Kabila's own cousin, Colonel Eddy Kapend, were sentenced to death, although they weren't under any capital punishment. 45 were proclaimed innocent and exonerated. 64 defendants were jailed. According to the German press agency DPA, the alleged summary had seen the execution of Commandant Masasu and 34 of his colleagues. The persecution of members of ethnic groups from eastern Congo continued.

In Goma, a spokesperson had confirmed that officers of the Congolese Armed Forces had staged a coup d'état against Kabila. Interior Minister Gaetan Kakudjihad denied this fact. Eddy Kapend made the following appearance on the Congolese television: “To the Army Chief of Staff, to commander of ground, air and naval forces and all regional military commanders: I order you to take charge of your units.” He continued, “Until further notice, no guns shall be fired for whatever reason.”

19 years later, on 8 January 2021, President Félix Tshisekedi had pardoned 28 of the convicted inmates who served their sentences in 2005 from the Makala Prison in Kinshasa. The countries involved have been speculated to be Rwanda which had been rivals with the Congo for a long period of time, and Angola.

Filmography 
Between 2009 and 2011, journalists Arnaud Zajtman and Marlène Rabaud researched and produced an investigative film about Kabila's killing with Al Jazeera. The film, titled Murder in Kinshasa, concludes that those convicted of Kabila's death are innocent, and that the assassination was in fact organized by Congolese rebel forces with the support of the Rwandan government, and approval of the United States.

References

Further reading

External links 

 The Guardian Article

Kabila
Kabila
2001 in the Democratic Republic of the Congo
Political history of the Democratic Republic of the Congo
Kabila
Kabila